Rancho San Pedro is a public housing project located in San Pedro, Los Angeles, California, near the Harbor of Los Angeles. Built in 1942, it is operated by the Housing Authority of the City of Los Angeles. A 191-unit extension was added later.

External links 

Public housing in Los Angeles
San Pedro, Los Angeles